Fa (Languedocien: Fan) is a former commune in the Aude department in southern France. On 1 January 2019, it was merged into the new commune Val-du-Faby.

Population

See also
Communes of the Aude department

References

Former communes of Aude
Aude communes articles needing translation from French Wikipedia
Populated places disestablished in 2019